"Playing Me" is a 2008 single from Swedish singer Jonathan Fagerlund taken from his debut album Flying and being the follow-up single to "Angeline".

The single made it to number 4 on Sverigetopplistan, the official Swedish Singles Chart for two consecutive weeks and stayed for a total of 7 weeks on the chart. It also reached second position at Digilistan.

Charts

References

2008 singles
Jonathan Fagerlund songs
2008 songs
Universal Music Group singles
Song articles with missing songwriters